Echelon Barracks was a former military barracks situated in Colombo Fort, Colombo. It was occupied by the newly formed Ceylon Army following independence.

History
Built during the late nineteenth century as headquarters of the British Army Garrison of Ceylon, the camp was made up of a two-storey barrack blocks, with wide verandahs, formed a square around a parade ground large enough for several football and hockey pitches. This parade ground gained the name Echelon Square and adjoined the then old Parliament (now the Presidential Secretariat). Until 1963 it was the regimental headquarters of the Ceylon Artillery and housed the Ministry of Defence. In the early 1970s the barracks were demolished to make way for commercial development.

Since 1997 the World Trade Centre, Colombo has stood in Echelon Square.

References

External links
1941-1945 Eastern Travels Part 4 by cjcallis, BBC

Barracks in Sri Lanka
Installations of the British Army
British colonial architecture in Sri Lanka
Government buildings in Colombo
Military of British Ceylon
Residential buildings in Colombo
Sri Lankan Army bases
World War II sites in Sri Lanka